Bravo(s)  or The Bravo(s) may refer to:

Arts and entertainment

Music

Groups and labels
Bravo (band), a Russian rock band
Bravo (Spanish group), represented Spain at Eurovision 1984
Bravo Music, an American concert band music publishing company

Albums
Bravo (5566 album) or the title song, 2008
Bravo (Dr. Sin album), 2007
Bravo! (EP), by Up10tion, or the title song, 2015
Bravo!, by Friska Viljor, 2006
Bravo!, by  Tube, 1997

Literature
The Bravo, an 1831 novel by James Fenimore Cooper
Bravo (magazine), a European German-language teen magazine
Bravo (Romanian magazine), a teen magazine

Television
Bravo (American TV network), a cable television network
Bravo (British TV channel), a digital television channel 1985–2011
Bravo (Canada), now CTV Drama Channel, a specialty arts television channel
Bravo (New Zealand), a free-to-air channel
Bravo! (TV series), a 1975–1976 Brazilian telenovela
Bravo TV (TV series), a 1985–1986 German programme
7Bravo, an Australian free-to-air channel

Other arts and entertainment
The Bravo (Titian), a 1516–17 painting by Titian
The Bravos, a 1972 American television film
Captain Bravo, a character in the manga and anime Buso Renkin
Bravo!, the Theatre on Ice skating teams of Essex Skating Club
Bravo Award, an annual football award presented by the Italian magazine Guerin Sportivo
ALMA Award, originally Bravo Awards, the American Latino Media Arts Award

Brands and companies
Bravo (application), software design to track number of players at a poker room in casinos
Bravo (editor), the first WYSIWYG word processor, developed at Xerox PARC
Bravo (Saudi Arabia), a digital radio trunking operator
Bravo (supermarket), an American grocery store chain
Chlorothalonil, sold under the brand name Bravo, a fungicide
Bravo Group, an American lobbying firm headed by Chris Bravacos
Bravo! Cucina Italian, an American restaurant chain operated by FoodFirst Global Restaurants
Bravo Transport, a Hong Kong public transport company and owners of operators Citybus and New World First Bus

Military
Bravo, the letter "B" in the NATO phonetic alphabet
Bravo, Bravo, Bravo, a vessel emergency code
Castle Bravo, code name of the first U.S. test of a "dry" thermonuclear device
Operation Bravo, a military operation during the Vietnam War

Places
Río Bravo, or Rio Grande, a river that flows through Mexico and the United States
Bravo Territory, former subdivision of Mexico
Bravo, Cuba, a community in the municipality of Santiago de Cuba

Transport

Aviation
Bravo Airlines, an airline based in Madrid, Spain
Bravo Airways, an airline based in Kyiv, Ukraine
Cessna Citation Bravo, a business jet
FFA AS 202 Bravo, a civil light aircraft
Mooney Bravo, an aircraft produced by the Mooney Aircraft Company

Other transport
Bravo-class submarine, a design of military submarines built in the then-Soviet Union
Fiat Bravo and Brava, a small family car produced from 1995 to 2001
Fiat Bravo (2007), a small family car produced from 2007 to 2014
Hobie Bravo, an American catamaran design
Lamborghini Bravo, a concept sports car

Other uses
Bravo (armed retainer) (plural bravi), a type of hired guard or soldier in 16th- and 17th-century Italy
Bravo (surname), a list of notable people with the name
BRAVO Volunteer Ambulance, a free volunteer ambulance service in New York City

See also